Dangerous Curves may refer to:

Film 
 Dangerous Curves (1929 film), an American circus film starring Clara Bow
 Dangerous Curves (1961 film), a Soviet comedy film
 Dangerous Curves (1988 film), an American comedy starring Tate Donovan
 Dangerous Curves (2000 film) or Stray Bullet II, an American-Irish action film

Television 
 "Dangerous Curves" (RuPaul's Drag U), an episode of RuPaul's Drag U
 "Dangerous Curves" (The Simpsons), a 2008 episode of The Simpsons
 Dangerous Curves (TV series), a 1990s American show in CBS's Crimetime After Primetime programming block
 Dangerous Curves, a 1999 A&E serial about Jayne Mansfield

Other media 
 Dangerous Curves (novel), a 1939 novel by the British writer Peter Cheyney
 Dangerous Curves (video game), a 1995 racing game
 Dangerous Curves (album), a 1991 album by Lita Ford
 "Dangerous Curves", a 2003 song by King Crimson from The Power to Believe
 Dangerous Curves, a 2008 autobiography by Terri O'Connell